Tuira may refer to:

Tuira River, a river in Panama
Tuira, Oulu, a neighbourhood in Oulu, Finland